Admiral Montagu may refer to:

Edward Montagu, 1st Earl of Sandwich (1625–1672), British Royal Navy admiral
George Montagu (Royal Navy officer) (1750–1829), British Royal Navy admiral
John Montagu (Royal Navy officer) (1719–1795), British Royal Navy admiral
Simon Montagu, 1st Baron Montagu (died 1316), English Admiral of the Fleet
Victor Montagu (Royal Navy officer) (1841–1915), British Royal Navy rear admiral
William Augustus Montagu (1785–1852), British Royal Navy vice admiral

See also
Robert Montague (Royal Navy officer) (1763–1830), British Royal Navy admiral